Music Is the Weapon is the fourth studio album by American electronic band Major Lazer, released on October 23, 2020, via Mad Decent. First announced in 2015, many conflicting statements have been made about the album, with the latest reports being that it will be the final Major Lazer album. It was later announced in 2019 that the album would instead be titled Lazerism, but the name was later changed back to the original title. It is the first album to be released after Jillionaire left the group and was replaced by Ape Drums. A deluxe edition of the album titled Music Is the Weapon (Reloaded) was released on March 26, 2021.

Background and singles
On April 27, 2015, Diplo revealed in an interview with Belgian radio station Studio Brussel that they have been working on a track with Belgian singer Selah Sue. He added that it might appear on their next album. Selah Sue herself confirmed this during an interview with Studio Brussels on May 4, 2015. In May 2015, Major Lazer revealed their fourth album would be called Music Is the Weapon.

A number of Major Lazer's singles released since the album's announcement have been reported to be on the album by journalists.  "Cold Water" was released on July 22, 2016, featuring Justin Bieber and frequent Major Lazer collaborator MØ. The song received widespread airplay and made it a number one hit on the UK Singles Chart. Following the success of the song, leaked collaborations with singers Sia, Lorde and Bonnie McKee were announced, as well as teasing collaborations with former Fifth Harmony girl band member Camila Cabello and alternative R&B singer PartyNextDoor. In August 2016, the band's member Diplo teased on social media that he was working with Benny Blanco on a collab with American singer Ariana Grande, who was featured in the two short clips as well. The band also confirmed that they were collaborating with artists The Weeknd and Travis Scott.

On September 30, 2016, "Believer", was released as a collaboration with Showtek. In December 2016, it was announced that a song from the album, "Run Up" featuring Nicki Minaj and PartyNextDoor, would be released as a single. Several days later, on December 6, 2016, the promotional single "My Number" was released, in collaboration with the newly formed band Bad Royale. It features uncredited vocals from Toots & The Maytals. On June 1, 2017, "Know No Better" featuring Travis Scott, Camila Cabello and Quavo, was released as the fourth single from the album. Also in June 2017, Diplo stated in an interview with Billboard: "I shifted my goal to just make singles, because no one really buys our albums". Despite this, outlets such as NME continued to report through 2017 that the album was scheduled for a 2018 release. Reports surfaced in January 2018 that the album would be released the following March, but the album failed to materialize in 2018. In June 2018, the songs released until then were reportedly to be on the album, according to Forbes, but had not received official confirmation. In an interview with Complex in September 2018, Diplo said that he thought the album would be released in 2019 and that it would be the last Major Lazer album.

Due to the album's delay, the song "Can't Take It from Me", featuring Skip Marley, was released as the album's new lead single on May 10, 2019. The album's second single, "Que Calor", featuring J Balvin and El Alfa, was released on September 11, 2019. On March 18, 2020, Diplo announced that the album is complete. "Lay Your Head on Me", featuring Marcus Mumford of Mumford & Sons, was released as the album's fifth single on March 26, 2020. On the same day, Diplo revealed on BBC Radio 1 with Annie Mac that the album would be released in June 2020, and that it would feature appearances such as Sia and Nicki Minaj.

In a 2019 interview with Complex, Diplo revealed that the album was no longer titled Music Is the Weapon and would instead be titled Lazerism. However, in September 2020, Major Lazer tweeted that the album would once again be called Music Is the Weapon with a release date set for October 23, 2020. The tweet had an accompanying album artwork. The official track listing for the album was revealed on October 15, 2020. "QueLoQue" featuring Paloma Mami was released as the album's seventh single on October 16, 2020.

Reception
The album's release was highly anticipated by a number of music and media outlets. Rolling Stone and WhatCulture listed it on its most anticipated albums of 2017 list. Complex named the album their 38th most-anticipated album of 2018. Idolator and Forbes also named it one of their most anticipated albums of 2018.

Track listing

Personnel
Major Lazer
 Diplo – composer, producer, executive producer 
 Walshy Fire – producer 
 Ape Drums – producer

Charts

References

2020 albums
Albums produced by Diplo
Mad Decent albums
Major Lazer albums
Albums produced by Beam